These are the results of the rhythmic individual all-around competition, one of two Rhythmic Gymnastic events at the 2000 Summer Olympics.

Qualification

24 athletes from 19 countries competed in the qualification round. The limit was two athletes per country. The top 10 would go on to compete in the final.

Final

External links
 http://www.gymnasticsresults.com/2000/o2000rh.html

Gymnastics at the 2000 Summer Olympics
2000
2000 in women's gymnastics
Women's events at the 2000 Summer Olympics